Sambal stingray, also known as Spicy Banana Leaf Stingray and by the Malay name Ikan bakar (barbecued fish), is a Malaysian/Singaporean seafood dish. Prepared by barbecuing stingray, it is served with sambal paste atop. Sambal stingray can be easily purchased at hawker centers in both Malaysia and Singapore.

History
Stingray was previously deemed as not popular and was cheap to purchase; given the enhancement of its taste, the value of stingray in markets has since risen. Originating from Malaysia, the dish is now also popular among Singaporeans. Its Malay name is Ikan bakar, which literally means barbecued fish.

Ingredients
The sambal paste served with the stingray is made up of spices (sometimes including belachan), Indian walnuts, and shallots. Other ingredients may include garlic, sugar, Chinese parsley, or raw peanuts. The paste is then spread on top of stingray fins, preferably fresh ones. In addition, female ones are preferred to male ones. White fish is in some instances used as an alternative, usually when stingray cannot be found. Flavor enhancers include white pepper or salt. Other recipes involve small amounts of brandy and olive oil. The dish is commonly accompanied with lime or lemon.

Preparation
Usually wrapped in banana leaves for ten minutes to cook, the fins of the stingray are first chopped to smaller bits. It also can be wrapped in ginger leaves or aluminium foil. Sambal stingray is charcoal-grilled.

Culture
Part of Malaysian cuisine, brought by the Portuguese traders to Malacca and used local ingredients. It is a Eurasian dish.

See also

 Malaysian cuisine

 Cuisine of Singapore

References

Fish dishes
Singaporean cuisine
Chili pepper dishes
Spicy foods